Count Alberto Pappafava or Pappafava  dei Carraresi (1832-1929) was an Italian painter, mainly of Romantic style landscapes, in watercolor and oil.

Biography
He depicted vistas of his extensive travels. Among his works are: Dintorni di Salisburgo; Dintorni di Lecco; Villagio in montagna; Via alla Chiesa; Altura; and Paesaggio lombardo. Among his paintings in maiolica are Interno di una casa; Laguna; Palude al tramonto and Sera. He was named Honorary Academic of the Royal Academy of Fine Arts of Venice.<ref>[https://books.google.com/books?id=lpMdAQAAIAAJ Atti della Reale Accademia e del Reale Istituto di belle arti in Venezia], Page 93.</ref> In his family's ancient domain in Frassanelle, he decided to create a natural landscape'' park, complete with artificial grottoes. His son Francesco Papafava was an economist and political writer.

References

19th-century Italian painters
Italian male painters
20th-century Italian painters
Italian photographers
1832 births
1929 deaths
Painters from Padua
Italian landscape painters
19th-century Italian male artists
20th-century Italian male artists